Leucogenenol is a blood cell stimulating secondary metabolite isolated from the mold Penicillium gilmanii.  Its chemical structure was reported; however, later studies determined that the original structure is incorrect and the true chemical structure of leucogenenol remains unknown.

References

Hematology